Patrick J. Doherty is a retired United States Air Force major general who last served as the director of plans, programs, requirements, and analysis of the Air Combat Command. Previously, he was the commander of the 19th Air Force.

References

External links

Year of birth missing (living people)
Living people
Place of birth missing (living people)
United States Air Force generals